The Twilight Saga: Breaking Dawn – Part 2 (Original Motion Picture Soundtrack) is the soundtrack album to The Twilight Saga: Breaking Dawn – Part 2, released on November 13, 2012. 

It is the fifth soundtrack in the saga's chronology, and it was once again produced by Alexandra Patsavas, the music director for the previous three films. The track list for the album was revealed on October 4, 2012, which included the announcement of the album's lead single.  The album sold 229,000 copies in the US in 2012, making it the third best-selling soundtrack album of the year.  It has sold 303,000 copies as of April 2013.

Track listing

Score

The score, like the original film as well as Breaking Dawn – Part 1, was composed by Carter Burwell, following Howard Shore, who scored Eclipse and Alexandre Desplat, who scored New Moon. The album was released in North America on November 27, 2012, by Atlantic Records. It contains elements from the scores of both New Moon and Eclipse.

Reception

Based on four reviews, Metacritic assigned the Breaking Dawn – Part 2 soundtrack an average score of 74, indicating "generally favorable reviews". Heather Phares, reviewing for Allmusic, said "It's fitting that the film's soundtrack is dominated by ballads that feel like a long goodbye to Bella, Edward, and Jacob", and said "As with the other volumes of the series' music, however, this collection provides a surprisingly good showcase for female, indie-ish talent." Phares concluded, "While Breaking Dawn isn't one of the more dynamic Twilight Saga soundtracks, it is one of the more emotive ones, and just may help fans get some closure as one of the biggest film franchises of the 2000s and 2010s comes to a close."

Charts

Weekly charts

Year-end charts

References

External links
Official Soundtrack for The Twilight Saga: Breaking Dawn – official Breaking Dawn soundtrack site

2012 soundtrack albums
2010s film soundtrack albums
The Twilight Saga (film series) soundtracks
Chop Shop Records soundtracks
Atlantic Records soundtracks

Romance film soundtracks
Drama film soundtracks
Fantasy film soundtracks